The enzyme dolichylphosphate-glucose phosphodiesterase (EC 3.1.4.48) catalyzes the reaction

dolichyl β-D-glucosyl phosphate + H2O  dolichyl phosphate + D-glucose

This enzyme belongs to the family of hydrolases, specifically those acting on phosphoric diester bonds.  The systematic name is dolichyl-β-D-glucosyl-phosphate dolichylphosphohydrolase. Other names in common use include dolichol phosphoglucose phosphodiesterase, and Dol-P-Glc phosphodiesterase.  This enzyme participates in n-glycan biosynthesis.

References

EC 3.1.4
Enzymes of unknown structure